Zindagi Aur Khwab is a 1961 Bollywood drama film produced by Dinu M. Desai and directed by S. Banerji. The film was declared above average at the box office.

Dattaram was the music director. Hit songs from the movie include 'Kehti Hai Jhuki Nazar' sung by Suman Kalyanpur.

Plot 
The story is about Shanti (Meena Kumari), an orphan, whose stepmother tortured her. Finally, she was married off to Shankar (Jayant), who was criminal and much older than her. Shankar Murders Chandabai a Mujrawali and Escapes. Police Chase his Truck, which falls in river and he is presumed dead. Inspector Manoj (Rajendra Kumar) keeps visiting Shanti for investigation and they both fall in love with each other. Shanti is hoping for a better life, but Shankar appears live and her hopes are dashed.

Cast
 Rajendra Kumar as Inspector Manoj
 Meena Kumari as Shanti
 Jayant as Shankar Lal
 Agha as Rasiya
 Ajit as Kailash
 Mumtaz Begum as Gajrabai
 Naazi as Rasili

Crew
Director – S. Banerji
Producer – Dinu M. Desai	
Story – Kamal Amrohi
Dialogues – Anand Dutta
Screenplay – Madhusudan Kelkar
Cinematography – Dinu M. Desai
Music – Dattaram
Lyrics – Kavi Pradeep
Editing – Ram Khade, Krishnarao Ambhavane
Art Direction – D. S. Malavankar
Playback Singers –Mukesh, Mohammed Rafi, Manna Dey, Suman Kalyanpur, Mubarak Begum, Kamal Barot

Soundtrack

References

External links 
 

1960s Hindi-language films
1961 films
Indian drama films